Satyadeep Misra, also known as Satyadeep Mishra, is an Indian actor who has worked in Hindi cinema, television and web series. He made his Bollywood debut with the 2011 film No One Killed Jessica.

Education
Satyadeep is an alumnus of The Doon School, Dehradun. He received a BA in history from St. Stephens College, Delhi, followed by a degree in law from the Delhi University.

Personal life
Mishra worked as a corporate lawyer in New Delhi and also had a brief stint with the Indian Government before he moved to Mumbai in 2010 to become an actor. He was married to Aditi Rao Hydari but the couple separated in 2013. He married Masaba Gupta on 27th January, 2023.

Filmography

Films

Television

Web series

References

Indian male film actors
Male actors in Hindi cinema
Male actors from Delhi
St. Stephen's College, Delhi alumni
The Doon School alumni
1972 births
Living people